Rossana Loreto Vidal Hernández (born 9 April 1970) is a Chilean politician who was elected as a member of the Chilean Constitutional Convention.

On 26 July 2021, she resigned from The List of the People.

References

External links
 BCN Profile

1970 births
Chilean nurses
Chilean women lawyers
20th-century Chilean lawyers
21st-century Chilean lawyers
Living people
University of Concepción alumni
University of Chile alumni
21st-century Chilean politicians
Members of the List of the People
Members of the Chilean Constitutional Convention
People from Valdivia